David O'Connor may refer to:

David O'Connor (Egyptologist) (born 1938), Australian Egyptologist
David O'Connor (equestrian) (born 1962), American international eventer
David O'Connor (footballer) (born 1985), Drogheda United player
 David J. O'Connor (1924–2011), member of the Massachusetts House of Representatives
David O'Connor (illustrator), an illustrator of The Fey Series
David O'Connor (rugby union) (born 1995), Irish rugby union player
David O'Connor (singer), Irish winner of series five of You're a Star in 2006–07

See also
David Connor (disambiguation)